John Joseph Sullivan may refer to:

 John Joseph Sullivan (bishop) (1920–2001), American clergyman of the Roman Catholic Church
 John J. Sullivan (diplomat) (1959-), American diplomat and current U.S. Deputy Secretary of State
 John Joseph Sullivan (judge) (1855-1926), Chief Justice of the Nebraska Supreme Court

See also
 John Sullivan (disambiguation)